Dmitri Nikolaevich Bekhterev (born 4 November 1949 in Tver) is a Russian rower who competed for the Soviet Union in the 1976 Summer Olympics.

In 1976 he was a crew member of the Soviet boat which won the silver medal in the coxed pairs event.

References

External links
 

1949 births
Living people
Russian male rowers
Soviet male rowers
Olympic rowers of the Soviet Union
Rowers at the 1976 Summer Olympics
Olympic silver medalists for the Soviet Union
Olympic medalists in rowing
Medalists at the 1976 Summer Olympics
Sportspeople from Tver